The Rettenbach glacier (german: Rettenbachferner or. Rettenbachgletscher) is a glacier in Europe, located near Sölden in the Ötztal Alps of Tyrol, Austria.

During the winter, the glacier is accessible by cable car and from spring time by car, using the Gletscherstraße.

The glacier is also an attractive area for regular skiers and plays an important role in connecting the main ski area of Sölden with the Tiefenbach glacier.

Alpine skiing
Since 2000, Rettenbach is a traditional World Cup season opening host with giant slalom in late October, for both men and women.

Fatal accidents
On January 5, 2015, two prospects for the United States ski team, Ronnie Berlack and Bryce Astle, were killed by an avalanche they triggered near Rettenbach glacier.

On 17 November 2015, Slovenian ex skier Drago Grubelnik died in a car accident on the 7th curve at  down the road, not far away from a World Cup finish area.

References

External links
FIS Alpine Ski World Cup – Soelden, Austria 
Ski-db.com - Soelden men's races

Glaciers of Austria
Glaciers of the Alps
Ski areas in Austria